Constructed in 1915, Elmer Ellis Library is the main library of the University of Missouri on the campus of the University of Missouri in Columbia, Missouri.  It was named in 1972 for former university president Elmer Ellis. With holdings of over three million volumes and six million microforms, The University of Missouri library system has been part of the Federal Depository Library Program since 1862.

The State Historical Society of Missouri and Western Historical Manuscript Collection are at the main branch of the library on Lowry Mall.

The Division of Special Collections is on 4th Floor West and houses rare books, the Comic Art Collection, and plat maps and insurance city maps of Missouri, as well as various other special collections. Some of the materials have been digitized and made available online.

Also in the main branch of Ellis is the Bookmark Café, which is on the ground floor. Aside from providing study space and social space for students and faculty, Bookmark Café also provides gallery space.

References

Library buildings completed in 1915
University of Missouri campus
Libraries in Missouri
Libraries in Columbia, Missouri
Buildings and structures in Columbia, Missouri
Federal depository libraries
University and college academic libraries in the United States
1839 establishments in Missouri
Special collections libraries in the United States